is a Japanese anime series produced by AIC Spirits, Ginga-ya, and Gonzo and directed by Hiroaki Sato. It is based on a pachinko game by Daito Giken.

Synopsis 
The story is set in a parallel world which combines elements of the Edo period such as samurai and the modern, such as disco halls and motorbikes. The kingdom is governed by Yoshimune, the eponymous title character in the series. All the characters are drawn super deformed and many of them have self-descriptive names.

Characters

Yoshimune 

The title character of the series and the lord of Edo Castle. He appears to be a negligent ruler but secretly sneaks out of the castle, donning the alter-ego of Yoshi in order to blend in with the commoners and try to solve their problems. He has also taken on the alias Yoshinoshin during a government-sponsored sword tournament. Yoshimune has a fear of dogs which he got by having one of Saien's devices used on him.

Hime 

A princess in the castle. She sneaks out on most nights to party at a disco hall where she is popular among the regulars. Jiji has commented she is the only one who can keep Yoshimune in check. She fell in love with Yoshi after he saved her from some kidnappers.

Baba 

The matriarch of Edo Castle. She has a mischievous personality and is either playing tricks on Hime, or teasing Jiji. She sometimes experiences OOBEs and has a crush on the singer Tamagoro.

Jiji 

He directly serves Yoshimune. Most of the time his job entails trying to control Yoshimune's outrageous behavior and he is frequently frustrated by the antics of the other inhabitants of the castle.

Kunoichi 

A female ninja and member of the Oniwabanshū under Kashira. Yoshimune seems to know her well, as he refers to her as "Kuno". She dislikes Hime and appears to be in love in Yoshimune, as she displays signs of jealousy when Yoshimune appears to be fighting hard in the sword tournament in order to kiss Hime.

Odaikan and Echigoya 
Two odd men who like to sit in secret places in the castle and make comments about how "evil" they are.

References

External links 
 

Anime series
Comedy anime and manga
2006 Japanese television series debuts
2006 Japanese television series endings